The First Army was created on 1 January 2015 in an effort to unify rebel ranks in southern Syria. Three prominent rebel units merged under this command structure.

History
During the 2015 Southern Syria offensive, the commander of the 1st Army, Colonel Saber Safar, was killed in action.

On 13 April 2015, it joined a number of other Southern Front affiliates in condemning the al-Nusra Front's ideology and discontinuing all forms of cooperation with it. 

After the Daraa offensive (June–July 2015), the 1st Army disbanded and only the Hamza Division continues to use the name.

See also
List of armed groups in the Syrian Civil War

References

Anti-government factions of the Syrian civil war
Military units and formations established in 2015
2015 establishments in Syria